Mercedes Independent School District is a public school district based in Mercedes, Texas (USA).

In addition to Mercedes, the district serves the unincorporated communities of Heidelberg, Indian Hills, and Relampago.

In 2009, the school district was rated "academically acceptable" by the Texas Education Agency.

Schools
Mercedes High School (Grades 9-12)
Sgt. Manuel Chacon Middle School (Grades 6-8)
John F. Kennedy Elementary School (Grades PK-5)
Ruben Hinojosa Elementary School (Grades PK-5)
Zachary Taylor Elementary School (Grades PK-5)
William B. Travis Elementary School (Grades PK-5
Sgt. William G.Harrell Middle School (Grades 6-8)
Mercedes Early College Academy (MECA)(Grades 9-12)

References

External links
 

School districts in Hidalgo County, Texas